is a Japanese footballer who currently plays for Portuguese side Casa Corval.

Career statistics

Club
.

Notes

References

2000 births
Living people
Association football people from Osaka Prefecture
Japanese footballers
Japanese expatriate footballers
Association football midfielders
Moldovan Super Liga players
Tokyo Verdy players
C.S. Marítimo players
FC Zimbru Chișinău players
Japanese expatriate sportspeople in Portugal
Expatriate footballers in Portugal
Japanese expatriate sportspeople in Moldova
Expatriate footballers in Moldova